Kay Warren (born Elizabeth Kay Lewis; February 9, 1954) is an American author, international speaker, Bible teacher and mental health advocate.  She is the co-founder of the sixth-largest evangelical megachurch in the United States, Saddleback Church. Her ministry is headquartered in Lake Forest, California.

Early life and education
Warren was born in San Diego, California, to Reverend B. LaVern and Bobbie Lewis. She attended California Baptist College in Riverside, California and earned a Bachelor of Arts degree from California State University, Los Angeles in 1976.

Warren married Rick Warren on June 21, 1975, and has three children: daughter Amy Warren Hilliker (born 1979), son Joshua Warren (born 1981), and son Matthew Warren (1985–2013).

Ministry

Saddleback Church launched with seven people as a Bible study group in 1980. During that same year, the first service took place in a high school gymnasium on Easter Sunday. In 2017 the church attendance was 22,000 people.

In 2004, Warren founded both the HIV/AIDS and orphan care initiatives at Saddleback Church. Through global summits about HIV/AIDS and civil forums held at the church, Warren and her husband gathered the private and public sectors with the faith community to promote HIV prevention, treatment and care, as well as advocating for orphaned children. Guest speakers at these events included President Barack Obama (then senator), President George W. Bush and First Lady Laura Bush, President Paul Kagame of Rwanda,  First Daughter Jenna Bush Hager, Senator Hillary Clinton, Senator John McCain, Bono, Ambassador Mark R. Dybul, United States Global AIDS Coordinator, and Dr. Peter Piot, director of the Joint United Nations Programme on HIV/AIDS.

Warren became an advocate for people living with mental illness and suicide prevention when her son, Matthew, took his life in 2013. Warren founded the Hope for Mental Health Initiative at Saddleback Church in 2014 and serves as an executive committee board member for the National Action Alliance for Suicide Prevention.

Warren was named on The Orange County Register's 100 Most Influential People List in 2016.

Selected bibliography

Son’s illness and death
Matthew Warren lived with mental illness and suicidal ideation from a young age. His diagnoses included depression, obsessive–compulsive disorder, bipolar disorder and near the end of his life, borderline personality disorder.  Matthew took his life on April 5, 2013.

References

External links
Kay Warren website
Saddleback Church website

1954 births
Living people
American evangelicals
American self-help writers
American women non-fiction writers
Baptist writers
California Baptist University alumni